Ighodaro Christian Osaguona (born 10 October 1990) is a Nigerian footballer who most recently played for Al-Shorta in the Iraqi Premier League as a striker.

Club career

Persepolis 
On 13 January 2020, Osaguona signed a half-season contract with Persian Gulf Pro League champions Persepolis. Also, the Iranian Reds hold an option to extend his deal for a further year.

Al-Shorta 
On 9 September 2020, the striker left Persepolis to sign a contract with Al-Shorta in the Iraqi Premier League.

International career
Osaguona was called up for national team for 2015 Africa Cup of Nations qualification matches and played his first international game with the senior national team on 10 September 2014 in and against South Africa (0–0), after he came on as a substitute for Gbolahan Salami in the 63rd minute of that game.

Honours

References

External links

 
 

Living people
Nigerian footballers
Nigeria international footballers
Buffles du Borgou FC players
Association football forwards
1990 births
Expatriate footballers in Morocco
Expatriate footballers in Belgium
Expatriate footballers in Qatar
Expatriate footballers in Iran
Expatriate footballers in South Korea
Expatriate footballers in Iraq
Rangers International F.C. players
Raja CA players
K.V. Mechelen players
K.V.C. Westerlo players
Belgian Pro League players
Umm Salal SC players
Qatar Stars League players
Persepolis F.C. players
Al-Shorta SC players